Thomas Jeanjean is a French accounting academic. Former president of the French Accounting Association. Thomas Jeanjean was the dean for executive education at ESSEC Business School. As of 2021, he is the Chief Education Officer at the Paris Île-de-France Regional Chamber of Commerce and Industry.

Career
Thomas Jeanjean is the Chief Education Officer at the Paris Île-de-France Regional Chamber of Commerce and Industry. He was a professor of accounting at the ESSEC Business School.  and the Dean of ESSEC Executive Education at ESSEC Business School. He was previously a professor at the HEC Paris and at the École normale supérieure de Cachan.  Primarily known for his published research in earnings management, corporate governance, international accounting and accounting history, he has also served on the editorial boards of a number of accounting journals, in particular the Spanish Journal of Finance and Accounting, Accounting in Europe,
Accounting and Business Research, Issues in Accounting Education, China Journal of Accounting Research, Comptabilité-Contrôle-Audit and The International Journal of Accounting.

Education
 2008  International Teachers Programme - SDA Bocconi - Italy
 2002  PhD. in Financial Accounting - University Paris Dauphine - France
 1997  Agrégation d'économie et gestion (National competitive exam to get a teaching qualification in financial accounting and corporate finance, Rank: 2nd)
 1996  Ecole Normale Supérieure de Cachan - France 
 1996  Magistère de Sciences de Gestion (Graduate Diploma in Management) - University Paris Dauphine - France

Selected publications
 Ding, Y., Hope, O., Jeanjean, T., & Stolowy, H. (2007). Differences between Domestic Accounting Standards and IAS: Measurement, Determinants and Implications. Journal of Accounting and Public Policy, pg. 1-28. 
 Jeanjean, Thomas., Ramirez, Carlos. (2008). Aux Sources des Théories Positives : Contribution à une Analyse des Changements de Paradigme dans la Recherche en Comptabilité. Comptabilité-Contrôle-Audit, 14(2), 1-22.
 Jeanjean, T., Stolowy, H. (2008). Do Accounting Standards Matter? An Exploratory Analysis of Earnings Management before and after IFRS Adoption. Journal of Accounting and Public Policy, 27(6):480-494.
 Jeanjean, T., & Stolowy, H. (2009). Determinants of Board Members’ Financial Expertise – Empirical Evidence from France. The International Journal of Accounting, 378-402.

References

Academic staff of ESSEC Business School
Year of birth missing (living people)
Living people